Happy Hollow may refer to:

Places
Canada
Happy Hollow, Alberta
Happy Hollow, Ontario

United States
Happy Hollow, Falmouth, Kentucky, a former segregated black district; the location of Elzey Hughes House
Happy Hollow, Missouri, an unincorporated community
Dundee-Happy Hollow Historic District, a neighborhood in Omaha, Nebraska
Happy Hollow Farm, in Fayetteville, Arkansas
Happy Hollow Park & Zoo, in San Jose, California
Happy Hollow Historic Site in Prattville, Alabama

Music
Happy Hollow (album), the fifth album by the American indie rock band Cursive